Hey, I'm a Ghost is the first full-length album from Greensboro, North Carolina band Sullivan.

Track listing
All songs written by Brooks Paschal, Zach Harward, Phil Chamberlain and Tyson Shipman.

 "Down Here, We All Float" (4:26)
 "Ten Ways to Impress" (3:52)
 "Cloudy" (3:49)
 "The Charity of Saint Elizabeth" (5:55)
 "Cars at Break-Neck Speeds" (4:09)
 "Gardens" (2:45)
 "Insurance for the Weak" (3:17)
 "How I Remember You" (4:09)
 "Promise Me" (3:34)
 "Under the Watchful Eyes of Dr. T.J. Eckleburg" (1:00)
 "Hey, I'm a Ghost" (3:55)

The title "Under the Watchful Eyes of Dr. T.J. Eckleburg" is a reference to F. Scott Fitzgeralds' novel 
The Great Gatsby. "Down Here, We All Float" is a reference to Stephen King's It.

References

Sullivan (band) albums
2006 debut albums
Tooth & Nail Records albums